Malacoctenus is a genus of labrisomid blennies native to the eastern Pacific Ocean and the Atlantic Ocean.

Species
There are currently 23 recognized species in this genus:
 Malacoctenus africanus Cadenat, 1951
 Malacoctenus aurolineatus C. L. Smith, 1957 (Goldline blenny)
 Malacoctenus boehlkei V. G. Springer, 1959 (Diamond blenny)
 Malacoctenus brunoi R. Z. P. Guimarães, Nunan (pt) & Gasparini, 2010
 Malacoctenus carrowi Wirtz, 2014 
 Malacoctenus costaricanus V. G. Springer, 1959
 Malacoctenus delalandii Valenciennes, 1836
 Malacoctenus ebisui  V. G. Springer, 1959 (Fishgod blenny)
 Malacoctenus erdmani C. L. Smith, 1957
 Malacoctenus gigas V. G. Springer, 1959 (Sonora blenny)
 Malacoctenus gilli Steindachner, 1867 (Dusky blenny)
 Malacoctenus hubbsi V. G. Springer, 1959 (Redside blenny)
 Malacoctenus macropus Poey, 1868 (Rosy blenny)
 Malacoctenus margaritae Fowler, 1944 (Margarita blenny)
 Malacoctenus mexicanus V. G. Springer, 1959
 Malacoctenus polyporosus V. G. Springer, 1959
 Malacoctenus sudensis V. G. Springer, 1959
 Malacoctenus tetranemus Cope, 1877 (Throatspotted blenny)
 Malacoctenus triangulatus V. G. Springer, 1959 (Saddled blenny)
 Malacoctenus versicolor Poey, 1876 (Barfin blenny)
 Malacoctenus zacae V. G. Springer, 1959 (Zaca blenny)
 Malacoctenus zonifer D. S. Jordan & C. H. Gilbert, 1882 (Glossy blenny)
 Malacoctenus zonogaster Heller & Snodgrass, 1903 (Belted blenny)

External links 

 
Labrisomidae
Marine fish genera
Taxa named by Theodore Gill